The Ormsby Baronetcy, of Cloghans in the County of Mayo, was a title in the Baronetage of the United Kingdom. It was created on 29 December 1812 for Charles Ormsby, Member of Parliament for Carlow Borough between 1801 and 1806. The title became extinct on the death of the third Baronet in 1833.

Ormsby baronets, of Cloghans (1812)
Sir Charles Montagu Ormsby, 1st Baronet (1767–1818)
Sir James Ormsby, 2nd Baronet (1796–1821)
Sir Thomas Ormsby, 3rd Baronet (1797–1833)

References

Extinct baronetcies in the Baronetage of the United Kingdom